Sathyameva Jayathe is a 2000 Indian Malayalam-language action thriller film directed by Viji Thampi. This film's dialogue was written by G A Lal. The film stars Suresh Gopi, Aishwarya, Hemanth Ravan, Siddique, Rajan P Dev and Balachandramenon. The film had musical score by C. Rajamani and songs by M. Jayachandran.

Cast 
Suresh Gopi as CI Chandrachoodan
Hemanth Ravan as Musharuf Ibrahim /Bharath Shah
Siddique as Balasubhramanyan aka Balu Bhai
Aishwarya as Nancy Mullakkadan
Balachandramenon as Basheer
Mini Nair as Sharada, Basheer's Wife
Rajan P Dev as SSP Thomas Pattimattom IPS, Kochi City Police Commissioner 
Maniyanpilla Raju as SI George 
N. F. Varghese as Joseph Mullakkadan
Cochin Haneefa as Adv. G Varghese
Salim Kumar as Mattancherry Mammathu, a petty thief
Devan as DCP Mathew Tharakan IPS, Mumbai Police
Spadikam George as Additional Director General
Sadiq as DYSP Ramavarma Thampan
Baburaj as Sivaratna
Kunchan as Police Constable
Nandhu as Police Constable
Krishna Kumar as Reji Mathew
Jagannatha Varma MP Mathan Tharakan
Kollam Thulasi
Bheeman Raghu as Sulaiman
Reena as Nancy's mother
James as Police Constable
Yamuna as George's wife
Prof. Aliyar
Sab John as Yeswanth(terrorist )

Soundtrack 
The music was composed by M. Jayachandran.

References

External links 
 

2000 films
2000s Malayalam-language films
Films directed by Viji Thampi
Films scored by M. Jayachandran